Otranto Plantation Indigo Vats are historic indigo vats located near Goose Creek, Berkeley County, South Carolina.  Indigo vats are where fermentation and settlement processes for production of indigo dyestuff were accomplished. Each vat measures approximately 14 feet square and has a stuccoed interior. The upper vat, known as the "steeper vat", was used for the fermentation of indigo plants with the liquor drawn through a small portal into the "beater vat" below. The liquor was agitated, allowed to settle, and the remaining sludge  strained, molded into cakes, and dried. The Otranto Plantation Indigo Vats were relocated by the Verona Chemical Company, later Mobay Corporation, from Otranto Plantation to their present site in 1979 to save them from demolition. They are the only such structures know to be in existence in South Carolina.

It was listed in the National Register of Historic Places in 1989.

References

Industrial buildings and structures on the National Register of Historic Places in South Carolina
Buildings and structures in Berkeley County, South Carolina
National Register of Historic Places in Berkeley County, South Carolina
Indigo structure dyes
Goose Creek, South Carolina
Plantations in South Carolina
Dyes